Gatis Gūts (born 15 April 1976, Ventspils) is a former Latvian bobsleigh pilot who had competed since 1994. Currently, he is one of the coaches of Latvian bobsleigh team. His two last seasons have seen him twice in the top ten in the World Cup, both times with co-pilot Intars Dīcmanis. He also competed at the 10 World Championships.Best result in  World Championships in Lake Placid 2003 where he and Intars Dīcmanis finished 5th in two man sled. Best World Cup in 4man was fourth.

Gūts competed in two Winter Olympics, earning his best finish of 12th in the four-man event at Salt Lake City in 2002. He retired after the 2006 Winter Olympics.

References
2002 bobsleigh two-man results
2002 bobsleigh four-man results
2006 bobsleigh two-man results
 
FIBT profile

External links
 
 
 
 

1976 births
Living people
Bobsledders at the 2002 Winter Olympics
Bobsledders at the 2006 Winter Olympics
Latvian male bobsledders
People from Ventspils
Olympic bobsledders of Latvia